Nikolaos Ioannidis (born 26 April 1994) is a Greek professional footballer who plays as a striker for Super League 2 club Athens Kallithea.

Club career

Early career
Although born in Germany, Nikos Ioannidis moved to Greece at a very early age and made his first football steps in Pandramaikos. Olympiacos initially showed interest and signed the player, who was included in the youth team of Olympiacos.

Olympiacos
On 18 April 2013, he made his debut for Olympiacos in a 6-2 Greek Cup win against Panthrakikos, coming off the bench to replace Kostas Mitroglou after 69 minutes.

Loan to Hansa Rostock
In July 2013 Germany's third division club Hansa Rostock has reached an agreement with the Greek football champion Olympiakos on a perpetual strategic partnership and borrowed in the course of the cooperation of the Greek Under-19 national team Nikolaos Ioannidis for a year. "In Greece there are no full-scale substructure in the form of second teams," said Rostock's sporting director Uwe Vester on Monday. "At this point we come into play, because highly talented, young players can so help us on our way and simultaneously collect valuable experience for their own careers."

Loan to PEC Zwolle
After the departure of Fred Benson and Guyon Fernandez,  PEC Zwolle was shy about attacking reinforcements. Eventually the cup holder hires Ioannidis who will plays on loan for the club in the Dutch Eredivisie since the season 2014/2015. His loan was ended on 9 January 2015, after a lack of prospect.

Loan to Borussia Dortmund
On 15 January 2015, Ioannidis is back in the 3. Liga. The striker, who played last season 30 games for Hansa Rostock (six goals), signed a contract with Borussia Dortmund II. This provides that the 20-year-old Greek until June 2016 on loan from Olympiacos Piraeus. Ioannidis was on loan to PEC Zwolle played only four league games and a game in the Europa League. He is still under contract with Olympiakos until 2019.

Asteras Tripolis
Asteras Tripolis officially announced the signing of 22-year-old Greek striker Nikos Ioannidis until the summer of 2018, for an undisclosed fee.
In his 10th appearance with the club, in a 2–1 home game against Veria, he scored a brace, sealing the victory for his club. On 1 July 2017, Ioannidis had mutually solved his contract with the club.

Diósgyőr
Diósgyőr officially announced the signing of the Greek striker until the summer of 2020, for an undisclosed fee. On 16 September 2017, he scored his first goal with the club in a 2–4 home loss game against Paksi FC.

Marítimo
On 2 September 2018, the Portuguese club Marítimo officially announced the signing of the Greek striker until the summer of 2021, for an undisclosed fee.

Doxa Drama
On 11 September 2019, the Greek Super League 2 club Doxa Drama F.C. officially announced the signing of the Greek striker until the summer of 2020, for an undisclosed fee.

Apollon Smyrnis
On 2 January 2020, the Greek Super League 2 club Apollon Smyrnis F.C. officially announced the signing of the Greek striker until the summer of 2020, for an undisclosed fee.

Career statistics

Honours
Olympiacos
Greek Cup: 2012–13

PEC Zwolle
Johan Cruijff Shield: 2014

Individual
Valeriy Lobanovskyi Memorial Tournament: Top Scorer 2015 (2 goals) with Luka Zahović

References

External links
 

1994 births
Living people
Citizens of Greece through descent
Greek footballers
Greece youth international footballers
Greece under-21 international footballers
Greek expatriate footballers
3. Liga players
Eredivisie players
Super League Greece players
Super League Greece 2 players
Nemzeti Bajnokság I players
Olympiacos F.C. players
FC Hansa Rostock players
Borussia Dortmund II players
PEC Zwolle players
Asteras Tripolis F.C. players
Diósgyőri VTK players
Doxa Drama F.C. players
Apollon Smyrnis F.C. players
Ionikos F.C. players
Expatriate footballers in the Netherlands
Expatriate footballers in Hungary
Greek expatriate sportspeople in Hungary
Greek expatriate sportspeople in the Netherlands
German people of Greek descent
Sportspeople of Greek descent
Association football forwards
People from Remscheid
Sportspeople from Düsseldorf (region)